Kostas Andritsos, also known as George Andrews (1 May 1916, Athens – 10 October 1993) was a Greek film director and writer.

Selected filmography    
Oneira koritsion 1953
Bouboulina  1959 
Exo oi kleftes! 1961 
Apolytrosis 1961 with Spiros Focás, Lorella De Luca
Scream 1964
Aera! Aera! Aera! (1972).

References

External links 
 

Greek film directors
1916 births
1993 deaths
Film people from Athens